Mount Greylock Regional School is a public middle and high school in Williamstown, Massachusetts, within the foothills of Mount Greylock. The school is part of the Mount Greylock Regional School District.

History
Mount Greylock Regional School is located on the site of a former airport in southern Williamstown. The school serves the community of Williamstown, as well as nearby Hancock, Lanesborough, and New Ashford.

Mount Greylock School has a chapter of the National Honor Society, and a local partnership with the Sage City Symphony.

Athletics
Mount Greylock Regional School ski teams have utilized Prospect Mountain in Vermont. The Ephs of Williams College use the high school facilities for cross country.

Notable alumni
Ali Fedotowsky, journalist
Chuck Hunt, businessman
Clara Claiborne Park, educator
Jonah Bayliss, baseball player

See also
List of high schools in Massachusetts

References

External links
Official website

Educational institutions in the United States with year of establishment missing
Public high schools in Massachusetts
Public middle schools in Massachusetts
Schools in Berkshire County, Massachusetts
Williamstown, Massachusetts